Edward F. Rakow (August 30, 1861 – September 2, 1942) was a member of the Wisconsin State Assembly.

Biography
Rakow was born on August 30, 1861 in Burlington, Wisconsin.

Career
Rakow was officially elected to the Assembly in 1903 in a special election. The special election was needed due to a tie with John H. Kamper in the original election in 1902. Additionally, Rakow was mayor, postmaster, clerk and an alderman of Burlington. He was a Democrat.

References

External links

People from Burlington, Wisconsin
Wisconsin city council members
Mayors of places in Wisconsin
Wisconsin postmasters
1861 births
1942 deaths
Democratic Party members of the Wisconsin State Assembly